HMAS Ballarat (FFH 155) is an Anzac-class frigate of the Royal Australian Navy (RAN). The frigate was laid down in 2000 and commissioned into the RAN in mid-2004. Since entering service, Ballarat has been involved in border protection as part of Operation Relex II, was deployed to the Gulf for Operation Catalyst, and was one of the two ships involved in the Operation Northern Trident 2009 round-the-world voyage. Ballarat has undergone the Anti-Ship Missile Defence (ASMD) upgrade, completing in 2015.

Design and construction

The Anzac class originated from RAN plans to replace the six River-class destroyer escorts with a mid-capability patrol frigate. The Australian shipbuilding industry was thought to be incapable of warship design, so the RAN decided to take a proven foreign design and modify it. Around the same time, the Royal New Zealand Navy (RNZN) was looking to replace four Leander-class frigates; a deterioration in New Zealand-United States relations, the need to improve alliances with nearby nations, and the commonalities between the RAN and RNZN ships' requirements led the two nations to begin collaborating on the acquisition in 1987. Tenders were requested by the Anzac Ship Project at the end of 1986, with 12 ship designs (including an airship) submitted. By August 1987, the tenders were narrowed down in October to Blohm + Voss's MEKO 200 design, the M class (later Karel Doorman class) offered by Royal Schelde, and a scaled-down Type 23 frigate proposed by Yarrow Shipbuilders. In 1989, the Australian government announced that Melbourne-based shipbuilder AMECON (which became Tenix Defence) would build the modified MEKO 200 design. The Australians ordered eight ships, while New Zealand ordered two, with an unexercised option for two more.

The Anzacs are based on Blohm + Voss' MEKO 200 PN (or Vasco da Gama-class) frigates, modified to meet Australian and New Zealand specifications and maximise the use of locally built equipment. Each frigate has a  full load displacement. A Combined Diesel or Gas (CODOG) propulsion machinery layout is used, with a single,  General Electric LM2500-30 gas turbine and two  MTU 12V1163 TB83 diesel engines driving the ship's two controllable-pitch propellers. The standard ship's company of an Anzac consists of 22 officers and 141 sailors.

As designed, the main armament for the frigate is a 5-inch 54 calibre Mark 45 gun, supplemented by an eight-cell Mark 41 vertical launch system (for RIM-7 Sea Sparrow or RIM-162 Evolved Sea Sparrow missiles), two  machine guns, and two Mark 32 triple torpedo tube sets (initially firing Mark 46 torpedoes, but later upgraded to use the MU90 Impact torpedo). They were also designed for but not with a close-in weapons system (two Mini Typhoons fitted when required from 2005 onwards), two quad-canister Harpoon anti-ship missile launchers (which were installed across the RAN vessels from 2005 onwards), and a second Mark 41 launcher (which has not been added). The Australian Anzacs use a Sikorsky S-70B-2 Seahawk helicopter; plans to replace them with Kaman SH-2G Super Seasprites were cancelled in 2008 due to ongoing problems.

Ballarat was laid down at Williamstown, Victoria on 4 August 2000. The ship was assembled from six hull modules and six superstructure modules; the superstructure modules were fabricated in Whangarei, New Zealand, and hull modules were built at both Williamstown and Newcastle, New South Wales, with final integration at Williamstown. She was launched on 25 May 2002, and commissioned into the RAN on 26 June 2004. She was the eighth ship of the class to be constructed, and the sixth to enter service in the Royal Australian Navy. The motto and badge of HMAS Ballarat are references to the events of the Eureka Stockade, which occurred at Ballarat in 1854.

Operational history
At the start of 2005, Ballarat was involved in Operation Relex II, a border protection operation in Australia's northern waters. Ballarat ran aground off Christmas Island near Flying Fish Cove on 22 January 2005 causing damage to the rudder and propellers from the sand and coral. There were no injuries to the crew.

In March 2006, Ballarat was deployed to the Persian Gulf to relieve HMAS Parramatta as part of Operation Catalyst, the Australian Defence Force's contribution to the rehabilitation and reconstruction of Iraq.

In December 2006 a request by members of the ship's company led to a re-launching of Ballarat Bitter, a beer originally brewed in Ballarat but stopped in 1989. Proceeds from the sale of the two limited releases were donated to the United Way charities. The brand's mascot, Ballarat Bertie, has been adopted by the ship as a mascot.

On the morning of 13 March 2009, Ballarat was one of seventeen warships involved in a ceremonial fleet entry and fleet review in Sydney Harbour, the largest collection of RAN ships since the Australian Bicentenary in 1988. The frigate was one of the thirteen ships involved in the ceremonial entry through Sydney Heads, and anchored in the harbour for the review.

On 20 April 2009, Ballarat and the Adelaide-class frigate  departed from Sydney as part of Operation Northern Trident, a six-month round-the-world voyage by the two vessels, with numerous diplomatic visits and joint exercises with foreign navies. During the night of 17 May, Ballarat and Sydney provided aid to two merchant vessels in the Gulf of Aden, driving off two separate groups of Somali pirates attacking the ships. Ballarat escorted an impromptu convoy of eight ships, including the two that were attacked, to safety, while Sydney remained in the area to report the incidents to Combined Task Force 151.

Ballarat completed the Anti-Ship Missile Defence (ASMD) upgrade in September 2015. The upgrade included the fitting of CEA Technologies' CEAFAR and CEAMOUNT phased array radars on new masts, a Vampir NG Infrared Search and Track system, and Sharpeye Navigational Radar Systems, along with improvements to the operations room equipment and layout.

In September 2018, Ballarat sailed at short notice to participate in the rescue of two round-the-world sailors in the southern Indian Ocean. The ship transported one of them back to Australia from Île Amsterdam after he was rescued by a French fishing boat.

In April 2021, "Ballarat" took part in the search for the missing Indonesian Navy submarine KRI Nanggala (402). The next month the ship participated in efforts to enforce sanctions against North Korea as part of Operation Argos.

Citations

References
Books

Journal articles

News articles

Websites

External links

Anzac-class frigates of the Royal Australian Navy
Naval ships of Australia
2002 ships
Fleet Base East
Military Units in Western Australia